Engelbert Sterckx (2 November 1792 – 4 December 1867), was the Archbishop of Mechelen, Belgium from 1832 to 1867.

Life
Engelbert (Engelbertus) Sterckx was born 2 November 1792 in Ophem, Brabant. His parents were farmers. He began his studies in Vilvoorde, after which he studied humanities at the college of Enghien (1805-1807). After secondary school in Leuven, he entered the Major Seminary of Mechelen on 18 September 1811 and in 1813 was named subsecretary of archdiocesan curia of Mechelen in 1813.

Sterckx was ordained, with an age exemption, as priest for the Archdiocese of Mechelen, on 18 February 1815. He was vice-regent and professor of philosophy and moral theology at Mechelen from 1815 to 1821 when he was appointed pastor at Boechout. In 1824 he was appointed archpriest of the Cathedral of Our Lady in Antwerp. In 1827, he was named vicar general to Archbishop, Francis Anthony de Méan of Mechelen, and organized the opposition of the clergy to the religious policies of William I.

Belgian independence
In 1830 the southern provinces seceded from the United Kingdom of the Netherlands and established a constitutional monarchy. The people of the south were nearly all Catholic; half were French-speaking. Many outspoken liberals regarded King William I's rule as despotic. There were high levels of unemployment and industrial unrest among the working classes. The liberal faction began to support the Catholics, partly to accomplish its own goals: freedom of education and freedom of the press.

Belgium became a separate ecclesiastical province with Mechelen as an archbishopric and the suffragan dioceses of Liège, Namur, Tournai (Doornik), Bruges and Ghent.

Archbishop
The new constitution guaranteed religious, educational and press freedom. Although not enthusiastic about all the provisions Sterckx decided they were tolerable. Not a profound thinker, Sterckx was a clever negotiator with a natural inclination to conciliatory pragmatism. He became Archbishop on 24 February 1832, but his consecration was initially delayed by rumors against him of liberalism. In 1833 he baptised Louis-Philippe, Crown Prince of Belgium, the eldest son of Leopold I of the Belgians.

Archbishop Sterckx took full advantage of the new freedoms to completely reorganized the Archdiocese, establishing schools, colleges, monasteries, charities and minor seminaries in Hoogstraten and Waver. The University of Mechelen was mainly the work of Sterckx, and was a revival of the famous University of Leuven, which had been founded in 1425 and closed in 1797. It opened in November 1834 and moved to Leuven in December 1835.

During the consistory of 13 September 1838 Pope Gregory XVI created him cardinal with the title of cardinal-priest of St. Bartholomew en l'Ile (San Bartolomeo all'Isola). He did not participate in the conclave of 1846 at which Pope Pius IX was chosen.

In 1842 Sterckx issued a decree regarding plainsong and the following year established a commission to prepare a new edition of choral books. The Mechlin Gradual and Vesperal was published in 1848.

In 1857 an anticlerical Liberal government came to power under the leadership of Charles Rogier and later Walthère Frère-Orban. Sterckx strongly opposed all interference, such as the law on cemeteries of 1862. In 1863, 1864 and 1867 he hosted a series of influential Catholic Congresses in Mechelen with the aim of invigorating Catholic social, cultural and political engagement.

Cardinal Sterckx died on 4 December 1867, in Mechelen where he rests in the crypt of the archbishops in St. Rombouts Cathedral.

Honours 
 Grand Cordon in the Order of Leopold.
 Knight Grand Cross in the Order of Leopold.

See also
 Archbishopric of Mechelen-Brussels

References

Sources
 Engelbert Cardinal Sterckx 

1792 births
1867 deaths
19th-century Roman Catholic archbishops in Belgium
Belgian cardinals
Roman Catholic archbishops of Mechelen-Brussels
Liberal Catholicism
Cardinals created by Pope Gregory XVI